Toulon–Hyères Airport is an airport serving Toulon, a commune in the Var department of the Provence-Alpes-Côte d'Azur region in France. It is also known as Hyères Le Palyvestre Airport. The airport opened in 1966.

Facilities 

Military use 
This airport is shared with the French Naval Aviation (Aéronautique navale), as Hyeres Naval Air Base (la base d'aviation navale d'Hyères). Several squadrons of helicopters and fixed-wing aircraft are based on the south-western side of the airport.

Airlines and destinations 
The following airlines operate regular scheduled and charter flights at Toulon–Hyères Airport:

Statistics

References

External links 

 Toulon–Hyères Airport (official site) 
 Aéroport de Toulon – Hyères (Union des Aéroports Français) 
 
 
 

Airports in Provence-Alpes-Côte d'Azur
Airports established in 1966